Udinese Calcio only faded a little bit compared to its club record-breaking 1997–98 season, in which it finished third in Serie A. With topscorer Oliver Bierhoff, midfielder Thomas Helveg and coach Alberto Zaccheroni all departing for Milan, Udinese was looking to be on the back foot prior to the start of the season.

Márcio Amoroso proved to be a worthy replacement for Bierhoff, with 22 goals following increased responsibility. With this, Amoroso became topscorer himself, and departed for Parma, with a substantial sum being paid by the Parmesans.

The highlight of Udinese's season was the qualification for the 1999–2000 UEFA Cup, which was clinched in a so-called spareggio against Juventus, since the clubs were tied on points for sixth. Thanks to a goalless draw at home, and Paolo Poggi's equaliser in Turin, Udinese clinched the sixth place and the UEFA Cup slot.

Squad

Goalkeepers
  Luigi Turci
  Harald Wapenaar

Defenders
  Valerio Bertotto
  Alessandro Calori
  Mohammed Gargo
  Régis Genaux
  Mauro Navas
  Alessandro Pierini
  Marco Zanchi

Midfielders
  Stephen Appiah
  Jonathan Bachini
  Morten Bisgaard
  Giuliano Giannichedda
  Martin Jørgensen
  Tomas Locatelli
  Eli Louhenapessy
  Mauricio Pineda
  Johan Walem
  Henry van der Vegt

Attackers
  Márcio Amoroso
  Hazem Emam
  Paolo Poggi
  Roberto Sosa
  Patrik Fredholm

Competitions

Serie A

League table

Matches

UEFA Cup qualification

6th and 7th of Serie A:

(Udinese therefore declared sixth in the league standings. Udinese qualified for the 1999–2000 UEFA Cup).

Top scorers

  Márcio Amoroso 22
  Roberto Sosa 10
  Martin Jørgensen 4

UEFA Cup

First round

References

Udinese Calcio seasons
Udinese